Joseph Georges Athale (born 11 July 1995) is a New Caledonian footballer who plays as a midfielder for Hienghène Sport. He made his debut for the national team on March 25, 2016 in their 1–0 loss against Vanuatu and has also represented his nation in beach soccer.

He joined Hienghène Sport in 2019 and scored for the club against ASPV Strasbourg in the seventh round of the Coup de France. He also
appeared in the 2019 FIFA Club World Cup, playing a full match against Al Sadd.

References

External links
 Oceania Football

1995 births
Living people
New Caledonian footballers
AS Magenta players
AS Lössi players
Gaïtcha FCN players
New Caledonia international footballers
People from the Loyalty Islands
Association football midfielders
2016 OFC Nations Cup players